Saladin K. Patterson is an American television writer and producer.

Biography
Patterson grew up in Montgomery, Alabama, near South Boulevard, and attended Loveless Academic Magnet Program. He then studied engineering at Massachusetts Institute of Technology, and entered a graduate psychology program at Vanderbilt University.

Career
Patterson left the graduate program at Vanderbilt to accept a "prestigious Disney|ABC Writing Fellowship", which gained him access to career opportunities in film and television. He landed a staff writer position on Teen Angel, and then became a writer for Frasier and for The Bernie Mac Show where he also was co-executive producer.

For seven years, he worked on Psych as a co-executive producer, and in 2019 he returned to sign with 20th Century Fox Television.

He is the developer of and executive producer of The Wonder Years revival, which premiered on ABC in September 2021. The series has averaged 2.35 million viewers per week since its debut.

References

Living people
African-American screenwriters
African-American television producers
MIT School of Engineering alumni
People from Montgomery, Alabama
Year of birth missing (living people)
Television producers from Alabama